A washing machine is an appliance used to wash laundry.

Washing machine may also refer to:
Washing Machine, a 1995 album by Sonic Youth
"Washing Machine", a 1986 track by Larry Heard under the name Mr. Fingers
"Washing Machine", a song by Kings of Convenience from the 2021 album Peace or Love
The Washing Machine, a 1993 Italian film originally released as Vortice Mortale

See also